All This Life is the fifth studio album by English rock band Starsailor. It was released on 1 September 2017. It is the first studio album released by the band since 2009's All The Plans. It was produced by Embrace guitarist Richard McNamara.

Background
The band had been on hiatus since 2009 while lead singer James Walsh and the other members concentrated on solo projects. The band reformed in 2015 with a tour to support their recent greatest hits album.

Singles
Three singles have been released from the album - "Listen to Your Heart", "All This Life" and "Take a Little Time".

All This Life Tour
The tour to support the album started in Cambridge on 12 October 2017 and continued to various venues across the UK.

Critical reception
AllMusic called All This Life "a sophisticated, organically produced album that nicely balances the expansive lyricism of their early albums with the robust stadium rock they embraced during the mid- and late 2000s."

Track listing

Chart positions
The album entered the UK Album chart at number 23 and stayed in the top 100 for one week.

Personnel
 Vocals and Guitars: James Walsh
 Keyboards: Barry Westhead
 Bass: James 'Stel' Stelfox
 Drums: Ben Byrne

Production
 Producer, Mixer and Engineer: Richard McNamara
 Mastering: Nick Watson at Fluid Mastering

References

2017 albums
Starsailor (band) albums
Albums produced by Steve Osborne
Virgin Records albums